
Gmina Klonowa is a rural gmina (administrative district) in Sieradz County, Łódź Voivodeship, in central Poland.

Villages
Gmina Klonowa contains the villages and settlements of Grzyb, Klonowa, Kuźnica Błońska, Kuźnica Zagrzebska, Leliwa, Lesiaki, Lipicze, Owieczki, Pawelce and Świątki.

Neighbouring gminas
Gmina Klonowa is bordered by the gminas of Brąszewice, Czajków, Galewice, Lututów and Złoczew.

References
Polish official population figures 2006

Klonowa
Sieradz County